John Doll is the name of:

 John J. Doll, current head of the United States Patent and Trademark Office (USPTO)
 John P. Doll (born 1961), American politician and former member of the Minnesota State Senate
 John Doll (Kansas politician)